Bobo-Dioulasso is a department or commune of Houet Province in south-western Burkina Faso. Its capital is the town of Bobo-Dioulasso.

Towns and villages

References

Departments of Burkina Faso
Houet Province